Greenwood Cemetery is the largest non-denominational cemetery in Ohio County, West Virginia, United States. It is located at 1526 National Road in Wheeling. The cemetery is maintained and operated by the Greenwood Cemetery Association. Members of several notable Wheeling families and natives including United States Congressmen Carl G. Bachmann, Chester D. Hubbard, William P. Hubbard, John O. Pendleton, and Benjamin Stanton, as well as Metropolitan Opera soprano Eleanor Steber, Medal of Honor recipient Daniel A. Woods, and architect Frederick F. Faris, are buried in the Cemetery.

External links
  Ohio County Public Library
 Photographs from Greenwood Cemetery
 
 
 

Cemeteries in West Virginia
Buildings and structures in Wheeling, West Virginia
Protected areas of Ohio County, West Virginia
Rural cemeteries